is a city located in Saitama Prefecture, Japan. , the city had an estimated population of 345,353 in 158,022 households and a population density of 5700 persons per km². It is famous for producing daruma dolls.

Geography
Koshigaya is situated in eastern Saitama Prefecture,  in the alluvial plain of the Nakagawa basin between the Omiya plateau and the Shimosa plateau. Most of the city area is flat with an average elevation of only five meters above sea level. Many rivers, including the Motoara River, Naka River, Ayase River, Furutone River, and Sakagawa River flow in the city. Koshigaya, which is about 25 kilometers north of Tokyo and developed as a transportation for water and land transportation from premodern times.

Surrounding municipalities
 Saitama Prefecture
 Saitama
 Kasukabe
 Kawaguchi
 Sōka
 Yoshikawa
 Matsubushi

Climate
Koshigaya has a Humid subtropical climate (Köppen Cfa) characterized by warm summers and cool winters with light to no snowfall.  The average annual temperature in Koshigaya is 14.7 °C. The average annual rainfall is 1408 mm with September as the wettest month. The temperatures are highest on average in August, at around 26.4 °C, and lowest in January, at around 3.1 °C.

Demographics
Per Japanese census data, the population of Koshigaya has increased rapidly from the 1960s.

History
The area around Koshigaya was an inlet of the sea in the Jōmon period and was settle during the Yayoi or early Kofun period. In the Nara period, it was a border area straddling Musashi and Shimōsa Provinces. Koshigaya-shuku prospered during the Edo period as a post station on the Nikkō Kaidō and the Ōshū Kaidō highways, and the town served as the temporary residence of the Tokugawa shōgun after the 1657 Great Fire of Meireki which destroyed Edo Castle. The town also had a riverine connection with Edo and served as a transportation and transshipment center.

Municipal timeline
 The town of Koshigaya (then spelled 越ヶ谷) was created within Minamisaitama District, Saitama with the establishment of the modern municipalities system on April 1, 1889.
 It annexed the neighboring villages of Ozawa, Niikata, Sakurai, Obukuro, Ogishima, Dewa, Gamo, Osagami, and Masubayashi on November 3, 1954 and changed the spelling of its name to its present form.
 Koshigaya annexed the neighboring village of Soka on November 3, 1955.
 Koshigaya was elevated to city status on November 3, 1958.

Koshigaya was elevated further to special city status on April 1, 2003 and to core city status on April 1, 2015.

Government
Koshigaya has a mayor-council form of government with a directly elected mayor and a unicameral city council of 32 members. Koshigaya contributes four members to the Saitama Prefectural Assembly. In terms of national politics, the city is part of Saitama 3rd district of the lower house of the Diet of Japan.

Economy
Koshigaya is a major regional commercial center with a diversified industrial base.

Education
Bunkyo University
Saitama Prefectural University
Saitama Toho Junior College
 Koshigaya has 30 public elementary schools and 15 public middle schools operated by the city government, and six public high schools operated by the Saitama Prefectural Board of Education. In addition, there are one private middle school and two private high schools. The prefecture also operates two special education schools for the handicapped.

Transportation

Railway
 JR East –  Musashino Line
 -  
 Tōbu Railway - Tōbu Isesaki Line
 -   -  -  -  -

Highway

Twin towns and sister cities
  - Campbelltown, New South Wales, Australia, since April 11, 1984

Local attractions
 Aritaki Arboretum
 Aeon Laketown shopping mall

In fiction
The actual scenery of Koshigaya is set in the anime and manga series, Miss Kobayashi's Dragon Maid. albeit with the name of "Oborozuka".

Noted people
Yasue Funayama, politician
Sumio Iijima, scientist
Atsushi Satō, one of the lead vocalists of EXILE
Tsubasa Masuwaka, fashion model 
Junri Namigata, professional tennis player
Abi Masatora, sumo wrestler
Ryuto Yasuoka, basketball player

References

External links

Official Website 

Cities in Saitama Prefecture
Koshigaya, Saitama